YTO Cargo Airlines Co., Ltd., operating as YTO Cargo Airlines is a Chinese cargo airline based in Hangzhou.

Destinations

YTO Cargo Airlines operates to 21 destinations in eight countries.

In July 2019, the airline launched new routes to Uzbekistan and the Philippines. On 2 November 2020, Singapore was added to its network.

Asia
 
 Dhaka - Hazrat Shahjalal International Airport
 
 Chengdu - Chengdu Shuangliu International Airport
 Guangzhou - Guangzhou Baiyun International Airport 
 Hangzhou - Hangzhou Xiaoshan International Airport Hub
 Tianjin - Tianjin Binhai International Airport
 Wuxi - Sunan Shuofang International Airport
 
 Bangalore - Kempegowda International Airport
 Mumbai - Chhatrapati Shivaji Maharaj International Airport
 
 Osaka - Kansai International Airport
 Tokyo - Narita International Airport
 
 Bishkek - Manas International Airport
 
 Karachi - Jinnah International Airport
 Lahore - Allama Iqbal International Airport
 
 Manila - Ninoy Aquino International Airport
 
 Singapore - Changi Airport
 
 Seoul - Incheon International Airport
 
 Bangkok - Suvarnabhumi Airport
 
 Tashkent - Islam Karimov Tashkent International Airport
 
 Ho Chi Minh City - Tan Son Nhat International Airport

Fleet
On 25 December 2017, the airline received its first Boeing 757-200PCF. In December 2021, the airline will be the launch customer of the Comac ARJ21F after plans to acquire the aircraft were announced.

As of 14 January 2022, the YTO Cargo Airlines fleet consists of the following aircraft:

References 

Cargo airlines of China
2015 establishments in China
Companies based in Hangzhou